D-12-ZB-TV (channel 12) is a television station in Batangas City, Philippines, airing programming from the GMA network. It is owned and operated by the network's namesake corporate parent alongside GTV outlet DZDK-TV (channel 26). Both stations share studios at the PNG Bldg., P. Burgos St. cor. Rizal Ave., Batangas City, while D-12-ZB-TV's transmitter is located atop Mt. Banoy.

In 2021, GMA Batangas started planning to upgrade as a new originating TV station. In 2022, GMA revealed the name of the flagship Filipino-language newscast of GMA Batangas, which it had launched on February 14, 2022, entitled "Balitang Southern Tagalog".

GMA TV-12 Batangas programs 
Balitang Southern Tagalog
Mornings with GMA Regional TV (simulcast from GMA Dagupan)
Word of God Network

Digital television

Digital channels

D-12-ZB-TV's digital signal operates on UHF channel 32 (581.143 MHz) and broadcasts on the following subchannels:

Rebroadcasters

D-12-ZB-TV's programming is relayed to the following stations across the Southern Tagalog.

Current Personalities
Ivy Kristina Saunar-Gasang, Anchor and News Editor of Balitang Southern Tagalog
Ace Medrano, Co-Anchor and Senior desk Manager of Balitang Southern Tagalog and Also as Full Time National Anchor of Regional TV News.
Andrew Bernardo, News Producer and Correspondent of Balitang Southern Tagalog
Paul Hernandez, News Producer and Correspondent of Balitang Southern Tagalog
Denise Hannah Mei Abante, News Producer and Correspondent of Balitang Southern Tagalog

Former
Ilonah Riego-Manalo (News Producer and Correspondent)
Lorenzo Ilagan (News Producer and Correspondent)
Russel Simorio (News Producer and Correspondent, temporary for a month, returned to One North Central Luzon)
Mark Lavarro (Senior Desk Manager and Part-time Correspondent)

Area of coverage 
 Batangas
 Laguna
 Cavite
 Rizal
 Portion of Quezon
 Portion of Oriental Mindoro
 Portion of Marinduque
Portion of Romblon

See also
List of GMA Network stations

References

GMA Network stations
Television stations in Batangas
Television stations in the Philippines
Television channels and stations established in 1983
Digital television stations in the Philippines